A list of films produced by the Bollywood film industry based in Mumbai in 1976:

Top-grossing films
The top twenty grossing films at the Indian Box Office in 
1976:

A-Z

References

External links
 Indian Film Songs from the Year 1976 - A look back at 1976 with a focus on the Hindi film song

1976
Lists of 1976 films by country or language
Films, Bollywood